Moritz Geisenheimer (1818 – 27 March 1878) was a German merchant, playwright, activist for Jewish Emancipation and the German Gymnastics and National Movement, one of the first sports officials in Düsseldorf, and a publicist and politician for the democracy movement during the German revolution of 1848–1849.

Life 
Born in Düsseldorf, Geisenheimer, a merchant, owned a shop for spices and colonial goods in the Düsseldorfer Altstadt at a central location in the Bolkerstraße, and later at Bahnstraße 41 (in the present day district of Stadtmitte). Well-read and interested in the contemporary issues facing Judaism in Germany, he wrote an article in 1841 for the Leipzig-based Allgemeine Zeitung des Judentums, in which he introduced the philologist and poet Ludwig Wihl. Wihl's brother, the painter Lazarus Wihl, was one of Geisenheimer's friends during the Vormärz period preceding the March revolution of 1848.

Geisenheimer's first contribution to public life in Düsseldorf was a drama that he, a previously unknown playwright, had submitted to the management of the Düsseldorfer Theater under the title The Bravo. It premiered on 30 March 1847 with only moderate success. The source material of the work was the novella The Bravo by James Fenimore Cooper, published in 1831, which tells the story of a Carlo, a freedom fighter for popular sovereignty and republicanism who finally decides to emigrate after being rescued from imprisonment, but vows to return in a better time. Critics regarded neither the performance of the play nor its ending with much enthusiasm.

In the summer of 1847, Geisenheimer also began to develop a political presence. Von Thile had claimed in a parliamentary session on 14 June 1847 that "the Jew in and of himself can have no fatherland but that to which his faith refers him. Zion is the fatherland of the Jews." Therefore, according to von Thile, Jews could never become Germans and were consequently also incapable of holding state office. Geisenheimer, together with the painter Louis Bacharach and the doctor Salomon Heinemann, protested against this in the liberal, Heidelberg-based Deutsche Zeitung with the following public statement:

In 1847, Geisenheimer was socially active in the field of gymnastics. That year, he was one of the founders of the "Gymnastics Club for Adults", one of the oldest gymnastics clubs in the Rhineland, which still lives on today under the name . In 1848, 1850 and 1851, he led its executive committee, which also took on the task of training the general population in combat-readiness.

When the March Revolution 1848 broke out in Düsseldorf and a vigilance committee led by Lorenz Cantador paraded through the streets of the city with great fanfare, associations with the goal of publicly expressing political interests emerged at the local level. As one of the leading figures of this association, which succeeded in getting its candidates elected to the Frankfurt National Assembly and the Prussian National Assembly with clear majorities, Geisenheimer represented the Düsseldorf democrats at the Rhineland-Westphalian Congress on 12 August 1848 in Cologne. He also acted as publisher and editor of the association's publication, Die Volksstimme.

Geisenheimer died after a prolonged period of suffering at the age of 59 in Düsseldorf, mourned by his wife, children and brother-in-law.

References 

German merchants
dramaturges
19th-century German Jews
19th-century German politicians
German opinion journalists
1818 births
1878 deaths
People from Düsseldorf